Spring Fling! is a 1995 American made-for-television comedy film directed by Chuck Bowman and starring James Eckhouse, Joyce DeWitt, Justin Burnette, Pat Harrington Jr., Jason Hervey.

Plot
Teacher, has taken her class on an excursion in Los Angeles. Problems begin when they get lost and the hotel they were supposed to stay at loses their reservations. After driving around they end up in an empty hotel.

Cast
 James Eckhouse as George
 Joyce DeWitt as Linda Hayden
 Justin Burnette as Teddy
 Pat Harrington Jr. as Guido Mazzolini
 Jason Hervey as John
 Christopher Daniel Barnes as Michael

Production
Spring Fling! was filmed mostly at San Diego and Mission Beach in California.

References

External links
 
 
 Spring Fling! at Movie Web

1995 television films
1995 comedy films
1995 films
American comedy television films
ABC Motion Pictures films
1990s English-language films
Films directed by Chuck Bowman
1990s American films